The Little Prince is the solo debut extended play (EP) by South Korean singer and actor Kim Ryeowook, a member from boy group Super Junior. It was released on January 28, 2016, by Label SJ, S.M. Entertainment and distributed by KT Music. The EP featured six tracks in total, including the lead single, "The Little Prince".

Background
The release of The Little Prince was not only anticipated as Ryeowook's first official solo album since his debut 11 years ago but also because it was the first release under Super Junior's own label "Label SJ", established by SM Entertainment in 2015 during the group's 10th anniversary.

Production and composition
The title track bearing the same name as the album was a ballad inspired by French author Antoine de Saint-Exupéry's novel "The Little Prince". The title track "The Little Prince" was a ballad song and a conversation between a man in pain from love and The Little Prince.

His album consists of songs that are very different in flavor. The lyrics for "POOM" was written by Ryeowook, and depicts the words that a son wants to tell his mother but doesn't know where to begin. "Foxy Girl" is a light mid-tempo dance song, and features rapper DinDin. Ballad song "Like a Star" help to bring out the clear vocals of Ryeowook, with orchestra and piano music. The album also includes a retro song "Hello" and the song "People you may know" which tells of one's feelings after seeing the photos of someone you have just broke up with appear on the social media recommendations.

Promotion

Release
On 19 January 2016, the first two teasers were uploaded via SMTOWN. The Little Prince was officially available on 28 January through online and regular stores.

Live Performance
Ryeowook hold his commemorative showcase for his mini-album release on the 25 January at 4pm. During the event, he presented the first stages of the songs from The Little Prince as well as the episodes related to the album. He also hold his first broadcast stage via M Countdown on the day of release.

Solo Concert
In addition to Ryeowook's solo promotions and album release, he held his first solo concert through SMTOWN's The Agit series called "Ever Lasting Star - RyeoWook" from February 19 until the 21st for three days at the SMTOWN's Coex Artium in Samseong-dong, Seoul. Due to popular demand, an additional three concerts were held from March 11 through the 13th.

Track listing

Release history

Chart performance

Album charts

Single charts
A Little Prince

Other charted songs

References

External links
 Ryeowook's official website

2016 EPs
EPs by South Korean artists
Korean-language EPs
SM Entertainment EPs